This is a list of universities and colleges in The Gambia.

Universities
 American International University West Africa
 EUCLID University
 University of the Gambia
 International Open University
 Legacy University

Colleges
 International Community College
 The Gambia College

Other institutions
 Gambia Hotel School (GHS)
 Gambia Technical Training Institute (GTTI)
 International Business College
 Management Development Institute (MDI)
 Rural Development Institute (RDI)
 Suna Institute of Science and Technology (SIST)
 Interlink Global College

References

Gambia
Universities
Gambia
Universities